Lili Marberg (9 December 1876 – 8 April 1962) was a German and Austrian actress. In 1907, she came to the Volkstheater, Vienna. She was a member of the Vienna Burgtheater from 1911 to 1950 where she played leading roles in the world premieres of plays by Schnitzler and Wedekind, among others.

Life 
Marberg was born in Grimma, the daughter of a teacher. She attended the Dresden Conservatory for a short while, but then moved to Zwickau where she began to act as a Dilettantin at the Goethe-Verein. She was a member of the Theater in Elberfeld-Barmen from 1898 to 1900. After one season at the Thalia-Theater in Hamburg, she moved on to the Münchner Schauspielhaus.

Marberg caused a sensation in the title role of Oscar Wilde's Salome in 1903, which remained in the repertoire for five years. She was depicted in the role by Leopold Schmutzler, performing the dance of seven veils; she was possibly also the model for a painting of Salome by Franz von Stuck.

In 1907, Marberg was called to the Volkstheater in Vienna to succeed Helene Odilon. In 1911, she became a member of the Burgtheater and remained there until 1950. On 14 October 1911, she played the female lead in the world premiere of Schnitzler's Das weite Land. When Shaw's Pygmalion received its world premiere in German on 16 October 1913, she played a lead role alongside . She also appeared in new plays by Frank Wedekind, Gerhart Hauptmann and Henrik Ibsen. When she became older she played character roles. She was awarded the title , became an honorary member of the Burgtheater, and was appointed professor.

Marberg was the second wife of the interior architect Karl Hans Jaray (1872–1944). The actor Hans Jaray, her stepson, had to flee Austria after the annexation of Austria by the Nazis.

Marberg died in Vienna at age 85.

References

Further reading 
 ; : Österreich-Lexikon in zwei Bänden. (in German) Österreichischer Bundesverlag, Wien 1966 
 György Sebestyén: Burgtheater-Galerie. 148 Künstlerporträts der „Ehrengalerie“ des Wiener Burgtheaters nach Aufnahmen von Csaba Tarcsay. (in German) with a historic-biographical documentation by Konrad Schrögendorfer. Vienna: Edition Tusch 1976, p. 154
 Karl Döhler; Wolfram Günther: Aus den Zwickauer Jugendjahren der unvergessenen Wiener Burgschauspielerin. (in German) In: Pulsschlag : aus der Geschichte und Natur unserer Heimat. Kulturamt. vol. 7, Zwickau 1963, pp. 23–26

External links

German actresses
German emigrants to Austria
1876 births
1962 deaths
People from Grimma